Mariánské Lázně is a spa town in Cheb District in the Karlovy Vary Region of the Czech Republic. It has about 12,000 inhabitants. Most of the town's buildings come from its Golden Era in the second half of the 19th century, when many celebrities and top European rulers came to enjoy the curative carbon dioxide springs.

The town centre with the spa cultural landscape is well preserved and is protected by law as an urban monument reservation. In 2021, the town became part of the transnational UNESCO World Heritage Site under the name "Great Spa Towns of Europe" because of its springs and architectural testimony to the popularity of spa towns in Europe during the 18th through 20th centuries.

Administrative parts
The town is made up of town parts and villages of Mariánské Lázně, Hamrníky, Chotěnov-Skláře, Kladská, Stanoviště and Úšovice.

Geography
The municipal territory extends into three geomorphological regions: the eastern part lies in a hilly landscape of the Teplá Highlands, the southwestern part with most of the built-up area lies in a flat area of the Upper Palatine Forest Foothills, and the northern tip lies in the Slavkov Forest. Most of the territory lies in the Slavkov Forest Protected Landscape Area.

History

German settlers were called into this region by Bohemian rulers from the Přemyslid dynasty in the 12th century.

Although the town itself is only about two hundred years old, the locality has been inhabited much longer. The first written record dates back to 1273, when there was a village of Úšovice. The springs first appear in a document dating from 1341 where they are called "the Auschowitzer springs" belonging to the Teplá Abbey. It was only through the efforts of Josef Nehr, the abbey's physician, who from 1779 until his death in 1820 worked hard to demonstrate the curative properties of the springs, that the waters began to be used for medicinal purposes. The place obtained its current name of Marienbad in 1808; became a watering-place in 1818, and received its charter as a town in 1868.

By the early 20th century, approximately 1,000,000 bottles of mineral water were exported annually from Marienbad. The water from the Cross Spring (Kreuzquelle, Křížový pramen) was evaporated and the final product was sold as a laxative under the name of sal teplensis. The modern spa town was founded by the Teplá abbots, namely Karl Kaspar Reitenberger, who also bought some of the surrounding forests to protect them. The inhospitable marshland valley was changed into a park-like countryside with colonnades, neoclassical buildings and pavilions around the springs.

The name Marienbad first appeared in 1786; since 1865 it has been a town. Then came a second period of growth, the town's Golden Era. Between 1870 and 1914 many new hotels, colonnades and other buildings were constructed or rebuilt from older houses. In 1872 the town got a railway connection with the town of Cheb and thus with the whole Austro-Hungarian Empire and the rest of Europe.

The town soon became one of the top European spas, popular with notable figures and rulers who often returned there. At that time, about 20,000 visitors came every year. It was also a popular resort and vacation venue for European rabbis and their Hasidic followers, accommodating their needs with kosher restaurants, religious prayer services, etc.

Marienbad remained a popular destination between World War I and World War II. After World War II, the ethnic German population of the town was forcibly expelled according to the Potsdam agreement, thereby emptying the town of the majority of its population. After the communist coup-d'état in 1948, it was sealed off from most of its foreign visitors. After the return of democracy in 1989 much effort was put into restoring the town into its original character. Today it is a spa town and a popular holiday resort thanks to its location among the green mountains of the Slavkovský les and the Český les, sport facilities (the town's first golf course was opened in 1905 by the British King Edward VII) and the proximity to other spa towns, such as Karlovy Vary (Karlsbad) or Františkovy Lázně (Franzensbad).

Demographics
Until their expulsion in 1945 the majority of the population of the town were German (see Sudetenland). Afterwards, the Czechoslovak authorities repopulated the town with Czechs from the hinterland.

As of 2022, with an average age of 46.4 years, the town has one of the oldest populations in the country, and the oldest among the towns with a population of over 10,000.

Transport
Mariánské Lázně is located on three important railway lines: Prague–Cheb, Plzeň–Karlovy Vary, and Františkovy Lázně–Bohumín.

Mariánské Lázně Airport is situated on the southern border of the town.

Public transport

The town's public transport is operated mainly by trolleybuses and accompanied by buses servicing the neighbouring villages. There are four trolleybus lines and four bus lines in operation.

The town council have proposed scrapping the trolleybus system in Mariánské Lázně several times since the late 1990s, claiming high network maintenance costs. Mariánské Lázně is one of the smallest towns in the world to operate a trolleybus system.

Sport
Mariánské Lázně has a motorcycle racing circuit. The venue, Speedway Longtrack, has hosted six Long Track World Champion finals and five rounds of Grand-Prix racing.

The town is known for the Royal Golf Club Mariánské Lázně.

Sights

Mineral springs and colonnades

The top attraction of the town is its 100 mineral springs (53 of them are tapped) with high carbon dioxide content and often also higher iron content, both in the town itself (40 springs) and its surroundings. The water in the springs has an average temperature of 7-10 °C, and is formed through interactions with the deep fault lines that run under the region. The mineral water is claimed to cure disorders of the kidneys and of the urinary tract, respiratory disorders, locomotive system disorders, metabolic disorders, oncological disorders and gynaecological disorders, including the treatment of sterility.

Many of the springs have pavilions and colonnades built around them. Among them are:
 Křížový pramen (Cross Spring) – a monumental pavilion with a cupola bearing a patriarchal cross and 72 Ionic columns was built over the spring in 1818–1826. Today's concrete building is a copy from 1911–1912, originally it was a light wooden and brick construction. The water from the spring is highly mineralized with a strong laxative effect, and has been used for both curative drinks and baths.
 Rudolfův pramen (Rudolph's Spring) – with a wooden pavilion built over the spring, some water is tapped and piped to the nearby colonnade and some is bottled. Its water is weakly mineralized with high calcium content and has been used to cure urinary problems.
 Karolinin pramen (Caroline's Spring) – named after the wife of the Emperor Francis I, Caroline Augusta. The nearby colonnade was built in 1869, the pavilion is a reconstruction from 1989. The water is weakly mineralized, with higher magnesium content.
 Ferdinandův pramen (Ferdinand's Spring) – the water from the spring, similar in composition to Křížový pramen, is bottled under the Excelsior label.
 Ambrožovy prameny (Ambrose's Springs)
 Lesní pramen (Forest Spring)
 Zpívající fontána (Singing Fountain)

The total yield of all of the springs is roughly 600 liters per minute.

Churches

Because of the diverse number of visitors the town is able to maintain churches of several denominations. These include the Anglican Church designed by the notable Victorian architect William Burges and founded by Lady Anna Scott in memory of her husband who died in Mariánské Lázně in 1867. The church was constructed in 1879, shortly before Burges's own death. It is no longer in use as a place of worship and is now a concert hall.

Notable people
Maurice Loewy (1833–1907), astronomer
Werner Stark (1909–1985), sociologist and economist
Eduard Petiška (1924–1987), poet and author
Peter Hofmann (1944–2010), German tenor
Alex Čejka (born 1970), golfer
Jakub Flek (born 1992), ice hockey player

Notable visitors
A number of notable people visited Mariánské Lázně, among them:

Edward VII, British King; took annual holidays here
Franz Joseph I, Austrian Emperor
Nicholas II, Russian Emperor
Frederick Augustus III, King of Saxony
Winston Churchill, British Prime Minister
George S. Patton, General of the United States Army
Johann Wolfgang von Goethe, German writer and statesman
Tomáš Garrigue Masaryk, president of Czechoslovakia
Edvard Beneš, president of Czechoslovakia
Frédéric Chopin, Polish composer
Alfred Nobel, Swedish innovator
Richard Wagner, German composer
Friedrich Nietzsche, German philosopher
Mark Twain, American author
Thomas Edison, American inventor
Emmy Destinn, operatic soprano

Twin towns – sister cities

Mariánské Lázně is twinned with:
 Bad Homburg vor der Höhe, Germany (1990)
 Chianciano Terme, Italy (2000)
 Kiryat Motzkin, Israel (2016)
 Malvern, England, United Kingdom (2013)
 Marcoussis, France (2005)
 Weiden in der Oberpfalz, Germany (2007)

See also
Marienbad Elegy, a poem by Goethe
Last Year at Marienbad, a 1961 French film by Alain Resnais

References

Further reading

External links

Tourist information
Mariánské Lázně travel guide
Hamelika.cz – History of Mariánské Lázně (in Czech)
Marienbad.com – Accommodation, sights and trips

 
Spa towns in the Czech Republic
Cities and towns in the Czech Republic
Populated places in Cheb District